Jeroen Heubach (born 24 September 1974) is a former Dutch footballer.

Career
Heubach made his first team debut on 11 December 1994 in a match against MVV. After three seasons in FC Twente's first squad, and merely playing a few league matches for the side, he was loaned out to the team he made his debut against, MVV from Maastricht. He was loaned out for two seasons from 1997 until 1999, and he became a solid left back for the club. Therefore, he returned to Twente. He picked up a winner's medal when Twente won the 2001 KNVB Cup after a penalty shoot-out

At Twente, he has gained cult status by the fans, for being a passionate FC Twente-fan, and at the same time remaining loyal with the club in more than a decade.

In January 2010, Heubach was loaned out to N.E.C., who were in desperate need of a left back after loaning out Youssef El Akchaoui.

Heubach retired from professional football in summer 2010. Twente won the Eredivisie that season but Heubach did not make any league appearances in the campaign.

Honours
FC Twente
 KNVB Cup Winner 2000–01

Background
 Twente supporters call him Heubach Hooligan because he showed his middle finger to supporters of Vitesse Arnhem and FC Utrecht. He is a fanatic supporter of his current club FC Twente.

References

1974 births
Living people
Dutch footballers
MVV Maastricht players
FC Twente players
NEC Nijmegen players
Footballers from Enschede
Eredivisie players
Association football defenders